Carl Wilhelm von Sydow (21 December 1878 – 4 March 1952) was a Swedish folklore scholar. A professor at Lund University, he was a pioneer of folklore studies in Sweden and contributed to establishing systematic methods in the field.

Early life and education
The son of Ludvig von Sydow, an agricultural school administrator, and Friherrin Göthilda Rappe, von Sydow was born in Ryssby and educated in Växjö; he entered Lund University as a student in 1897 and earned his master's degree in 1908 with a study of the legend of Finn and his wife and his doctorate in 1909 with a thesis titled Två spinnsagor—en studie i jämförande folksagoforskning (Two Spinning Legends—A Study in the Comparative Study of Folk Legends). During his university studies, he taught at folk high schools and met the Danish folklorist Henning Frederik Feilberg, who inspired him to begin collecting folk tales. In 1907 he published Våra folkminnen—Folksaga, folksägen, folktro (Our Folklore—Folktale, Legend, and Folk Belief) and participated in the founding of the Federation of Folklore Fellows' Communications in Copenhagen. Another folklorist who influenced him was Axel Olrik, who was to have been the disputant for his PhD thesis.

Career
Von Sydow was appointed a lecturer in Nordic and comparative folkloristics at Lund University in September 1910, and became a professor in 1938. In April 1940 he was awarded a personal chair. He was a pioneer of radio lecturing, beginning in 1926. In 1914 he founded the journal Folkminnen och folktankar; in 1921 he became head of the foundation for the study of Swedish folklore established by Gunnar Olof Hyltén-Cavallius. He also advised the Swedish government on the formation of a commission to study peasant culture, which was established in 1924.

He was called up for national service during World War I. In the 1930s he was a founder member of the Nazi-sympathising  (National Swedish-German Association) and served as vice president, but in April 1940 he resigned his membership. 

In addition to his publications on folklore, von Sydow contributed to the establishment of methodical study in the field in Sweden, and his work was influential in other countries, particularly Ireland; beginning with Tors färd till Utgård (Thor's Journey to Útgarð), one of his areas of particular interest was Celtic influence in Germanic folklore and literature, and Irish Gaelic was among several languages he learnt in adulthood and one he taught at Lund in the 1920s. An early interest in botany and zoology caused him to take a scientific approach to folklore study: in 1927 he originated the concept of the oicotype or ecotype, a form of a folktale which arose in adaptation to local circumstances, and suggested several other terms, such as dite (a saying) and memorate (a personal narrative, usually concerning a supernatural encounter). Starting in the 1920s, he came to regard many supernatural beings and customs in modern folk belief as ficts, fanciful explanations often meant to manage children by creating a bogeyman, and therefore came into conflict with other scholars' religio-historical theories, such as Wilhelm Mannhardt's analyses of harvest customs. He also came to repudiate the Finnish School in folklore studies as atomistic; he focussed on the transmission of folktales between individuals, for example drawing a distinction between 'active' and 'passive' tradition carriers or bearers (tale tellers and audience members).

Personal life
In 1906 von Sydow married , a painter. They had a son, Bertil von Sydow, born in 1907. After Anna von Sydow's death in 1924, he remarried to his second cousin Friherrin Maria Margareta Rappe, a school teacher, in 1926. Their son, born in 1929, was the actor Max von Sydow.

Honours
Honorary doctorate, National University of Ireland, 1937

References

Further reading
 

Swedish folklorists
1878 births
1952 deaths
Academic staff of Lund University
Members of the Royal Gustavus Adolphus Academy